The Five Cities of June is a 1963 American short documentary film directed by Bruce Herschensohn. It was nominated for an Academy Award for Best Documentary Short.

This United States Information Agency-sponsored film details the events of June 1963 in five different cities. In the Vatican, the election and coronation of Pope Paul VI; in the Soviet Union, the launch of a Soviet rocket as part of the Space Race with the United States; in South Vietnam, fighting between Communists and South Vietnamese soldiers; in Tuscaloosa, Alabama, United States, the racial integration of the University of Alabama opposed by Governor George Wallace; and in Berlin, President John F. Kennedy's visit to Germany and Rudolph Wilde Platz.

See also
 Charlton Heston filmography

References

External links

, posted by the National Archives and Records Administration

watch The Five Cities of June at the John F. Kennedy Presidential Library and Museum

1963 films
1963 documentary films
1963 short films
1960s short documentary films
American short documentary films
American black-and-white films
Documentary films about cities
Documentary films about Berlin
United States Information Agency films
1960s English-language films
1960s American films